Lakemba is the name of two places, and the Sydney one was directly named after the Fijian one.

Lakemba, New South Wales is a suburb in the south-west of Sydney.  It is named after Lakeba (pronounced Lakemba) which is an island in Fiji (see below).
Lakemba Mosque is in the suburb and is one of the largest mosques in Australia
Lakemba railway station serves the suburb
The Electoral district of Lakemba is based around the suburb in Sydney
Lakeba, originally spelt Lakemba, is an island in the Lau Group of Islands in the Eastern Division of Fiji.